Ali Karimli born Ali Amirhuseyn oglu Karimov (born 28 April 1965) is an Azerbaijani politician and the head of the reformist wing of the Azerbaijan Popular Front Party (APFP).

Biography
Karimli was born in the Saatly District of southeastern Azerbaijan. After military service in the Soviet army in 1985, he studied law at the Baku State University. During his studies he established and headed the Yurd (Homeland) movement which supported democratic reforms. In November 1988, Yurd, supported by intellectuals, organized student meetings in Baku to protest the communist regime. Special units of the security services were used to suppress the demonstrations. Like other Azerbaijani nationalists, Karimov changed his name erasing the Russian ending -ov and became Əli Kərimli.

Political career
In July 1989 Karimli led Yurd into the newly created Popular Front of Azerbaijan (PFA) movement. He headed a party cell at his university and participated in the creation of the movement's charter.

In 1991, after receiving his diploma, he started working as a teacher in the Baku State University Law Department. At the same time, Karimli worked as a correspondent with the independent Azadlıq (Freedom) newspaper.

In January 1992, he was elected the deputy chairman of the PFA Supreme Council. In April 1993, the head of the PFA and the President of Azerbaijan Abulfaz Elchibey (Azerbaijan's first elected President after the breakup of the Soviet Union) appointed Karimli as Secretary of State.

After the coup d'etat in the summer of 1993 which brought Heydər Əliyev to power, Karimli submitted his resignation. In 1995, the PFA was renamed as the Azerbaijan Popular Front Party (APFP), with Elchibey remaining as its chairman. From 1995 till 2000 Karimli was Elchibey's first assistant. In the parliamentary elections of 1995 and 2000, he was also elected as a member of parliament. In 2000, after Elchibey's death, the APFP broke up into "conservative" and "reformist" wings. Karimli became the head of the "reformists", which was mostly made up of former activists of the Yurd.

He considers himself an Elchibeyist.

Since 2003, Karimli has been calling for creation of a bloc of opposition parties. In spring 2005, under Karimli's initiative, the Freedom (Azadıq) bloc of three parties was created, comprising the APFP-reformists, the Equality Party (Müsavat) and the Democratic party.

As another attempt against opposition rights his international passport was confiscated, making Ali Karimli one of the few opposition leaders of the world without a valid international passport.

Karimli is active in organizing protests that have rattled Baku since March 2011, part of a regional wave of unrest. He was interrogated for eight hours by the office of Attorney General Zakir Qaralov on 16 April in connection with the protests.

In April 2016, after Kerimli criticized the Azerbaijani government over its actions during the 2016 Armenian–Azerbaijani clashes, he became a subject of a series of protests (the latest one held on 12 April in front of Karimli's house), allegedly organized by the authorities. The protesters also demanded to exile him from the country. According to the human rights lawyer Intigam Aliyev, attacks against Karimli are simply diverting attention from truly important issues and testing technologies to distract people's justified anger caused by the serious consequences of wrong decisions.

Criticism 
Razi Nurullayev, former Deputy Chairman of Azerbaijani Popular Front Party, accused Ali Karimli instructing party members to create hundreds of fake Facebook profiles and demanded from Ali Karimli to disclose the source of financial support for his son's education at Bristol University.

His son Turkel Karimli is criticized in local media to have a luxurious and careless life in expensive London clubs.

References
Sources
Forrest, Brett (28 November 2005). "Over A Barrel in Baku". Fortune, pp. 54–60.
Notes

1965 births
Living people
Azerbaijani Popular Front Party politicians
Members of the National Assembly (Azerbaijan)
Azerbaijani diplomats
Azerbaijani educators
Azerbaijani democracy activists
Baku State University alumni